Andrea de la Torre Pérez (born 22 August 1990) is a Spanish female handballer for KH-7 Granollers and the Spanish national team.

De la Torre won the gold medal at the 2018 Mediterranean Games.

References 

Living people
1990 births
Spanish female handball players
Handball players from Catalonia
Sportspeople from Terrassa
Competitors at the 2018 Mediterranean Games
Mediterranean Games gold medalists for Spain
Mediterranean Games medalists in handball